Podalia dimidiata is a moth of the Megalopygidae family. It was described by Gottlieb August Wilhelm Herrich-Schäffer in 1856. It is found in Brazil.

References

Moths described in 1856
Megalopygidae